The McCabe–Thiele method is a chemical engineering technique for the analysis of binary distillation. It uses the fact that the composition at each theoretical tray (or equilibrium stage) is completely determined by the mole fraction of one of the two components and is based on the assumption of constant molar overflow, which requires that:

 the molar heats of vaporization of the feed components are equal;
 for every mole of liquid vaporized, a mole of vapor is condensed; and
 heat effects such as heat of solution are negligible. 

The method was first published by Warren L. McCabe and Ernest Thiele in 1925, both of whom were working at the Massachusetts Institute of Technology (MIT) at the time.

Construction and use

A McCabe–Thiele diagram for the distillation of a binary feed is constructed using the vapor-liquid equilibrium (VLE) data for the lower-boiling component of the feed.

On a planar graph, the horizontal (x) axis represents the mole fraction of the liquid phase, and the vertical (y) axis represents the mole fraction of the vapor phase; the 45-degree x = y line (see Figure 1) is used as a visual aid. The equilibrium line (black line in Figure 1), drawn using the VLE data points of the lower boiling component, represents the equilibrium vapor phase compositions for each value of liquid phase composition. Vertical lines from the horizontal axis up to the x = y line indicate the feed and desired compositions of the top distillate product and the corresponding bottoms product (shown in red in Figure 1).

The rectifying section operating curve for the section above the feed inlet of the distillation column (shown in green in Figure 1) starts at the intersection of the distillate composition line and the x = y line and continues at a downward slope (Δy/Δx) of L / (D + L), where L is the molar flow rate of reflux and D is the molar flow rate of the distillate product. For example, in Figure 1, assuming the molar flow rate of the reflux L is 1000 moles per hour and the molar flow rate of the distillate D is 590 moles per hour, then the downward slope of the rectifying section operating curve is 1000 / (590 + 1000) = 0.63, which means that the y-coordinate of any point on the line decreases 0.63 units for each unit that the x-coordinate decreases.

The  q-line (depicted in blue in Figure 1) starts at the x = y line and intersects the starting point of the rectifying section operating line. The parameter q is the mole fraction of liquid in the feed, and the slope of the q-line is q / (q – 1). For example, if the feed is a saturated liquid, it has no vapor, thus q = 1 and the slope of the q-line is infinite (a vertical line). As another example, if the feed is all saturated vapor, q = 0 and the slope of the q-line is 0 (a horizontal line). The typical McCabe-Thiele diagram in Figure 1 uses a q-line representing a partially vaporized feed. Example q-line slopes are presented in Figure 2. 

The stripping section operating line for the section below the feed inlet (shown in purple in Figure 1) starts at the intersection of the red bottoms composition line and the x = y line and continues up to the point where the blue q-line intersects the green rectifying section operating line.

The number of steps between the operating lines and the equilibrium line represents the number of theoretical plates (or equilibrium stages) required for the distillation. For the binary distillation depicted in Figure 1, the required number of theoretical plates is 6.

Constructing a McCabe–Thiele diagram is not always straightforward. In continuous distillation with a varying reflux ratio, the mole fraction of the lighter component in the top part of the distillation column will decrease as the reflux ratio decreases. Each new reflux ratio will alter the gradient of the rectifying section curve.

When the assumption of constant molar overflow is not valid, the operating lines will not be straight. Using mass and enthalpy balances in addition to vapor-liquid equilibrium data and enthalpy-concentration data, operating lines can be constructed using the Ponchon–Savarit method.

If the mixture can form an azeotrope, its vapor-liquid equilibrium line will cross the x = y line, preventing further separation no matter the number of theoretical plates.

See also
Fractional distillation
Azeotropic distillation

References

External links
More detailed information on how to draw a McCabe-Thiele Diagram
Detailed discussion of McCabe-Thiele method by Tore Haug-Warberg, Norwegian University of Science and Technology, Norway
 Interactive McCabe-Thiele Diagram

Distillation